The 1940 United States presidential election in Tennessee took place on November 5, 1940, as part of the 1940 United States presidential election. Tennessee voters chose 11 representatives, or electors, to the Electoral College, who voted for president and vice president.

Tennessee was won by incumbent President Franklin D. Roosevelt (D–New York), running with Secretary of Agriculture Henry A. Wallace, with 67.25% of the popular vote, against Wendell Willkie (R–New York), running with Minority Leader and Oregon senior Senator Charles L. McNary, with 32.35% of the popular vote. As of the 2020 presidential election, this is the last occasion when Knox County has voted for a Democratic presidential candidate.

Results

Results by county

References

Tennessee
1940
1940 Tennessee elections